The 1720 Treaty of The Hague was signed on 17 February 1720 between Spain and the Quadruple Alliance, established by the 1718 Treaty of London. Its members included Britain, France, the Dutch Republic and Austria.

By signing, Spain joined the Alliance, ending the War of the Quadruple Alliance and accepting the terms of the Treaty of London. As previously agreed at Utrecht in 1713, Philip V confirmed his renunciation of the French throne and Spanish claims to their former Italian possessions. In exchange, Emperor Charles VI renounced his claim on the Spanish throne and four year old Charles of Spain was recognised as heir to the Duchies of Parma and Tuscany.

In another clause, Savoy and Austria exchanged Sicily for Sardinia.

Background

The central principle of the 1713 Treaty of Utrecht ending the 1701 to 1714 War of the Spanish Succession was neither France or Austria could be united with Spain. In return, Philip V, grandson of Louis XIV, was confirmed as the first Bourbon king of Spain. He ceded Naples, Sicily, Milan and the Southern Netherlands to Austria, and Sardinia to Savoy, while Britain retained Gibraltar and Menorca.

Philip viewed regaining these as vital to his prestige and this became the key foreign policy objective for Spain's new Chief Minister, Cardinal Giulio Alberoni. A native of Parma, Alberoni arranged the 1714 marriage between Philip and Elisabeth Farnese, niece of the Duke of Parma. She also supported this policy; Philip had two sons from his first marriage next in line to the Spanish throne and she wanted to create an Italian inheritance for her own children.

When Louis XIV died in 1715, his five year old great-grandson became Louis XV; if he died, the closest legitimate heir was his uncle, Philip of Spain, casting doubt on the renunciation made at Utrecht. Emperor Charles VI, Austrian candidate for the Spanish throne until becoming Holy Roman Emperor in 1711, also refused to formally renounce his claim. The Duke of Orléans, who served as Regent during Louis XV's minority, needed peace to rebuild the economy, which meant ensuring compliance with Utrecht; since this required British support, it led to the 1716 Anglo-French alliance.

Austria had delayed implementation of the Dutch Barrier, an objective for which the Dutch Republic effectively bankrupted themselves. In January 1717, they joined France and Britain in the 1717 Triple Alliance, which reiterated the provisions of Utrecht and agreed Savoy and Austria would exchange Sicily and Sardinia. Alberoni calculated neither Britain or France would fight for these and with Austria involved in the 1716-1718 Austro-Turkish War, Spain occupied Sardinia unopposed in 1717. In early 1718, he began preparing for an attack on Sicily; unlike Sardinia, this was considered vital for British trade and in June, a naval force under Admiral Byng arrived in the Western Mediterranean as a deterrent.

To prevent an escalation, British chief minister Earl Stanhope and Guillaume Dubois, French Foreign Minister, offered Philip the Italian duchies of Parma and Tuscany. However, he rejected this and Spanish forces landed on Sicily in early July; in response, Britain and France agreed the Treaty of London on 18 July, setting out their terms for ending these disputes and inviting Austria, Spain and Savoy to join. After signing the Treaty of Passarowitz with the Ottoman Empire on 22 July, Austria joined the Alliance on 2 August.

Although Byng's squadron destroyed the Spanish fleet at the Battle of Cape Passaro on 11 August, Philip still hoped to negotiate control of Sicily. This was due to tensions within the Alliance; anxious to protect their Spanish trade, the Dutch Republic refused to join the war while many French statesmen preferred an alliance with Philip, rather than Britain. This was strengthened by Spain granting trade privileges to French merchants and chartering French ships to resupply their forces in Sicily.

However, the discovery in December 1718 of a Spanish-backed conspiracy to replace Orléans as Regent allowed him to position his response as an attack on Alberoni, not Philip, and France declared war on 2 January 1719. Austrian forces in Sicily had mixed success but without control of the sea, Spanish defeat was inevitable. An attempt to divert British resources with the 1719 Jacobite Rising failed, while the Capture of Vigo in October showed how vulnerable the Spanish coastline was to the Royal Navy. Philip dismissed Alberoni in December 1719 and agreed to end the war.

Terms
There was minimal discussion of terms; by joining the Quadruple Alliance on 17 February 1720, Spain confirmed acceptance of the terms agreed by France, Britain, the Dutch Republic and Habsburg Austria on 2 August 1718. These included confirmation neither France or Austria could be united with Spain, agreed Savoy and Austria would exchange Sicily and Sardinia and made Philip's third son Charles of Spain heir to Parma, Piacenza and Tuscany.

Aftermath
The treaty failed to end concerns over attempts to alter the Utrecht settlement, illustrated by the 1721 Treaty of Madrid, a mutual defence agreement between France, Spain and Britain. The British monarch, George I, agreed to raise the question of returning Gibraltar in Parliament 'at a favourable opportunity', which the Spanish viewed as a commitment to return it. Commercial tensions between the two countries and frustration at the lack of progress would lead to a new Anglo-Spanish War in 1727.

References

Sources

External links
 Original text of the treaty in New Latin (pages 26–27, from "Philippi V. Regis Hispaniarum Accessio iterata")
 

1720 treaties
Peace treaties of the Kingdom of Great Britain
Peace treaties of the Netherlands
Peace treaties of Spain
Treaty of The Hague
1720 in the Dutch Republic
Treaty of The Hague
1720 in Great Britain
Peace treaties of Austria
Peace treaties of the Ancien Régime
Treaties of the Habsburg monarchy
Treaties of the Dutch Republic
Treaties of the Spanish Empire
18th century in The Hague
1720 in the Habsburg monarchy
Charles VI, Holy Roman Emperor